Hunt is an occupational surname related with hunting, originating in England and Ireland. In Estonia, the surname Hunt is also very common, it means wolf in the Estonian language. 

The Irish family surname is derived from Ó Fiachna and the significance is fiach means "the chase"; the clan itself was part of the Connachta's Síol Muireadaigh (kindred to the Ó Conchubhair and Mac Diarmada), located in County Roscommon and County Sligo.

People
Aaron Hunt (born 1986), German footballer
Abijah Hunt (1762–1811), American merchant, planter and banker
Adam Hunt (born 1993), British darts player
Akeem Hunt (born 1993), American football player
Albert Hunt (disambiguation)
Alexandra Hunt, American public health researcher and activist
Alfred Hunt (1817–1888), American industrialist
Alfred E. Hunt (1855–1899), American metallurgist and industrialist
Arthur Surridge Hunt (1871–1934), English papyrologist
Aubrey Thomas de Vere (1814–1902), Irish poet and critic (de Vere Hunt)
Ben Hunt (baseball) (1888–1927), American baseball player
Ben Hunt (rugby league) (born 1990), Australian rugby league player
Bonnie Hunt (born 1961), American actress and writer
Brad Hunt (disambiguation)
Cameron Hunt (born 1994), American football player
Caroline Rose Hunt (1923–2018), American heiress and philanthropist
Carolyn Hunt (born 1937), American educator, politician, and First Lady of North Carolina
Charles Cooke Hunt (1833–1868), Australian explorer
Chris Hunt, British journalist and author
Chris Hunt (badminton) (born 1968), English badminton player
Christopher Hunt (1584–1607), English bookseller and stationer
Clark Hunt (born 1965), American businessman and sports executive
Cletidus Hunt (born 1976), American football player
Cole Hunt (born 1994), American football player
David Hunt (disambiguation)
Dryden Hunt (born 1995), Canadian ice hockey player
Duane Garrison Hunt (1884–1960), American; Roman Catholic Bishop of Salt Lake City
E. Howard Hunt (1918–2007), American intelligence officer and writer
Earl B. Hunt (1933–2016), American psychologist
Earl Gladstone Hunt Jr. (1918–2005), American Methodist pastor
Elisha Hunt (1779-1873), American entrepreneur behind the historic steamboat Enterprise
Ella Hunt (born 1998), English actress
Ernie Hunt (born 1943), English footballer
Esther Hunt (1751–1820), American Quaker pioneer
Fern Hunt (born 1948), American mathematician
Flint Gregory Hunt (1959–1997), American murderer
Florence Hunt (born 2007), English actress
Frank W. Hunt (1871–1906), American politician
Fred Hunt (disambiguation)
Frederick Vinton Hunt ("Ted", 1905–1972), American acoustic engineer
Gareth Hunt (1942–2007), British actor
Gary Hunt (born 1984), sports diver, specialising in cliff or high diving.
George Hunt (disambiguation)
Georgina Hunt (1922–2012), English abstract artist
Gertrude Breslau Hunt (1869–1952), American author and lecturer
Greg Hunt (born 1965), Australian politician
Harriet Hunt (born 1978), British chess player
Henry George Bonavia Hunt (1847–1917), English music educator
H. Guy Hunt (1933–2009), American politician
H. L. Hunt (1889–1974), American oil tycoon and political activist
Helen Hunt (born 1963), American actress
Henry Hunt (disambiguation)
Herbert Hunt (footballer), English footballer
Jack Hunt (RAF officer) (1899–1954), British aviator
Jack Hunt (American football) (born 1981), American football player
Jack Hunt (footballer) (born 1990), English footballer
Jackie Hunt (1920–1991), American football player
James Hunt (1947–1993), British racing driver
Jeremy Hunt (born 1966), British politician
Jeremy Hunt (cyclist) (born 1974), British cyclist
Jerry Hunt (1943–1993), American composer
Jim Hunt (born 1937), American politician
John Hunt (disambiguation)
Johnny Hunt (born 1952), American pastor and author
Jon Hunt, British entrepreneur
Jonathan Hunt (disambiguation)
J. McVicker Hunt (1906–1991), American educational psychologist
Justin Hunt (filmmaker) (born 1976), American filmmaker
Justin Hunt (rugby league), (born 1988) Australian rugby league player
Kareem Hunt (born 1995), American football player
Karmichael Hunt (born 1986), Australian football player
Kathryn Hunt, British actress
Kelley Hunt, American blues pianist, singer, and songwriter
Ken Hunt (disambiguation), including those named Kenneth
Kimberly Hunt, American television journalist
Lamar Hunt (1932–2006), American sports promoter
Leigh Hunt (1784–1859), English author and critic
Lester C. Hunt (1892–1954), American politician
Linda Hunt, (born 1945), American actress
Lucas Hunt, (born 1976) American poet
Margus Hunt, (born 1987), Estonian discus thrower and American football player
Mark Hunt, (born 1974), New Zealand mixed martial artist and kickboxer
Mark Hunt (footballer) (born 1969), English footballer
Marsha Hunt (actress, born 1917) (1917–2022), American actress
Marsha Hunt (actress, born 1946), American actress, singer and novelist
Martin Hunt, Nauruan minister and MP
Mary Hunt Affleck (1847–1932), American poet
Megan Hunt (born 1995), Australian rules footballer
Megan Hunt (politician) (born 1986), Nebraska State Senator
Michael John Hunt (born 1941), English painter
Mike Hunt (born 1956), American football linebacker
Mike Hunt (1907–1996), American baseball player
Neil Hunt, Australian rugby league player
Nelson Bunker Hunt (1926–2014), American businessman
Noel Hunt (born 1982), Irish footballer
Paul Hunt (disambiguation)
Peter Hunt (disambiguation)
Ralph Hunt (disambiguation)
Ray C. Hunt (1919–?), American military officer
Rex Hunt (born 1949), Australian television and radio journalist
Rex Hunt (governor) (1926–2012), British diplomat
Richard Hunt (disambiguation)
Rimo Hunt (born 1985), Estonian footballer
Robert Hunt (disambiguation)
Roger Hunt (disambiguation)
Ron Hunt (born 1941), American baseball player
Ron Hunt (born 1933), English footballer
Ron Hunt (born 1945), English footballer
Sally Ward Lawrence Hunt Armstrong Downs (1827–1896), American socialite also known as Sallie Ward
Samuel Hunt (disambiguation)
Stephen de Vere (1812–1904), MP, poet and philanthropist (de Vere Hunt)
Stephen Hunt (disambiguation)
Stuart Hunt (1927–2014), American politician
Swanee Hunt (born 1950), American diplomat
Thomas Hunt (disambiguation)
Tim Hunt (born 1943), British biochemist
Tristram Hunt (born 1974), British historian and politician, Labour MP for Stoke
Una Hunt (born 1876), American author
Walter Hunt (disambiguation)
Washington Hunt (1811–1867), Governor of New York
Wesley Hunt (born 1981), American politician
William Hunt (disambiguation)

Fictional characters
Blanche Hunt, in the British soap opera Coronation Street
Dylan Hunt (Andromeda), protagonist of the television series Andromeda
Deirdre Hunt (later Langton, Barlow and Rachid) in Coronation Street, daughter of Blanche
Ethan Hunt, main character in Mission: Impossible films
Gene Hunt, main character in the TV series Life on Mars and Ashes to Ashes

References

See also

 Attorney General Hunt (disambiguation)
 General Hunt (disambiguation)
 Justice Hunt (disambiguation)
 Lord Hunt (disambiguation)
 

Surnames of English origin
English-language surnames
Estonian-language surnames